First Nations usually refers to Indigenous peoples, for ethnic groups who are the earliest known inhabitants of an area.

First Nations, first nations, or  first peoples may also refer to specific first peoples, including:

Indigenous groups
First Nations is commonly used  to describe some Indigenous groups including:
First Nations in Canada, a term used to identify Indigenous peoples of Canada who are neither Inuit or Métis
Indigenous Australians, or "Australian First Nations" are people with familial heritage from, and membership in, the ethnic groups that lived in Australia before British colonisation

Lists 
List of Indigenous peoples
Lists of First Nations (Canada)
List of First Nations band governments (Canada)
List of First Nations peoples (Canada)
List of Australian Aboriginal group names
List of federally recognized tribes in the United States

Other uses
 "First Nation" (song), a 2020 song by Midnight Oil
 First Nation Airways, a defunct Nigerian airline
 First Nation Screaming Eagles, a junior ice hockey team in Thunder Bay, Ontario, Canada

See also

Aborigine (disambiguation)
American Indians (disambiguation)
 Indian (disambiguation)
Native Americans (disambiguation)